Clayton Village is an unincorporated community located near U.S. Route 82 in Oktibbeha County, Mississippi, near Starkville and approximately  south-southwest of Osborn.

Clayton Village was named after Edgar Pomeroy Clayton, former owner of The Guntown Hottimes, a weekly newspaper. He was Superintendent of Education for Lee County from 1908 to 1914 and was head of the Poultry Department at Mississippi A & M College (now Mississippi State University) from 1924 to 1927. He retired to a farm at the site of Clayton Village where he died in 1956.

References

Unincorporated communities in Oktibbeha County, Mississippi
Unincorporated communities in Mississippi